The Calgary Bronks were a professional Canadian football team based in Calgary, Alberta, that competed in the Alberta Rugby Football Union (ARFU) in 1935 and 1936, as well as the Western Interprovincial Football Union (WIFU) from 1936 and 1940. 

After the Second World War they were succeeded by the Calgary Stampeders but the Bronks are not part of the Stamps franchise history or records.

Notable players
Bronks player include Bob Cosgrove, Paul Rowe and Bill Wusyk. Carl Cronin was head coach of the team from 1935 to 1938.

Calgary Bronks seasons
List of Calgary Bronks (football) seasons

References

Canadian football teams in Calgary
Defunct Canadian football teams
1935 establishments in Alberta
1940s disestablishments in Alberta
Sports clubs established in 1935
Sports clubs disestablished in 1940